The 2011 Philippine Basketball Association (PBA) Governors' Cup, is the third and last conference of the 2010-11 PBA season. The tournament started on June 11 and ended on August 21. The Barako Bull Energy Boosters have extended their leave of absence and Smart Gilas declined to join the season ending conference.

The tournament featured a handicapping system in which will be based on the results of the Philippine Cup and Commissioner's Cup (60% for the Philippine Cup and 40% for the Commissioner's Cup). The top four teams will be allowed with an import with a 6'2" height limit. The next four teams will be allowed with a 6'4" import and the last two teams will be allowed with a 6'6" import.

Format
The following format will be observed for the duration of the conference:
 Single-round robin eliminations; 8 games per team; Teams are then seeded by basis on win–loss records. Ties are broken among points differences of the tied teams.
 The top six teams after the eliminations will advance to the semifinals.
 Semifinals will be a single round-robin affair with the remaining six teams. Results from the eliminations will be carried over. A playoff incentive for a finals berth will be given to the team that will win at least four of their five semifinal games that does not finish within the top two.
 The top two teams (or the #1 team and the winner of the playoff between team with at least 4 semifinal wins and the #2 team) will face each other in a best-of-seven championship series.

Elimination round

Team standings

Schedule

Semifinal round

Team standings

Results

Finals

Imports 
The following is the list of imports, which had played for their respective teams at least once, with the returning imports in italics. Highlighted are the imports who stayed with their respective teams for the entire conference.

Import handicapping
*did not participate in the Governors Cup

Awards

Players of the Week

References

External links
 PBA.ph

PBA Governors' Cup
Governors' Cup